Armas Pyy (27 May 1913 – 29 July 1996) was a Finnish footballer. He played in fourteen matches for the Finland national football team from 1937 to 1943. He was also part of Finland's squad for the football tournament at the 1936 Summer Olympics, but he did not play in any matches. He played his whole club career for Helsingin Jalkapalloklubi, where he won Finnish football championship twice.

References

External links
 

1913 births
1996 deaths
Finnish footballers
Finland international footballers
Footballers from Helsinki
Association football defenders
Helsingin Jalkapalloklubi players